FK Proleter Makedonski Brod is a football club from Makedonski Brod, North Macedonia. They was recently played in the Macedonian Third League.

History
The club was founded in 1937.

References

External links
Club info at MacedonianFootball 
Football Federation of Macedonia 

Football clubs in North Macedonia
Association football clubs established in 1937
1937 establishments in Yugoslavia
FK